is a  mountain located on the border of Minami-ku, Fukuoka, Sawara-ku, Fukuoka and Jonan-ku, Fukuoka, Fukuoka Prefecture, Japan. Mount Abura is the location where the Indian Buddhist priest Seiga produced the first camellia oil from seeds made in Japan during the Nara period. Abura means oil in Japanese.

The Aburayama Incident occurred on August 10, 1945 in a wooden area near the municipal crematory when the Imperial Japanese Army executed and beheaded a total of eight US Army prisoners who were crew members of a Boeing B-29 aircraft. After the World War II, Genzō Abe, the 24th mayor of Fukuoka, built a memorial at the site. In addition, all the personnel who were involved in the incident were charged with conventional war crimes in separate trials convened by the Tokyo War Crimes Tribunal.

This mountain is easily accessible from downtown by car and is loved by local people as a relaxation spot.

Facilities
Mōmōland Aburayama farm
Aburayama citizens forest
Aburayama Kannon Shōkaku-ji

Routes
The most popular route to climb this mountain is from Aburayama Denchi Guchi Bus Stop of Nishitetsu Bus. It takes about one hour to the top. Extra bus services from Fukudaimae Station on Subway Nanakuma Line are available on Sundays and public holidays between March and November.

Gallery

References

External links

Abura
Abura